Đorđe Lazić (born 19 May 1996) is a Serbian water polo player. He was a member of the Serbia men's national water polo team that won a gold medal at the 2020 Summer Olympics.

References

1996 births
Living people
Sportspeople from Belgrade
Water polo players at the 2020 Summer Olympics
Serbian male water polo players
Olympic gold medalists for Serbia in water polo
Medalists at the 2020 Summer Olympics